Binalong is a closed railway station on the Main South railway line in New South Wales, Australia. The original station opened in Binalong in November 1876 on the original rail alignment, which was bypassed with a deviation in 1916. The new island station opened on the new alignment in 1916 and is now closed to passenger services. It survives in good condition. The original station on the old alignment is in use as a private residence.

See also

Binalong railway station and telegraph office

References

Disused regional railway stations in New South Wales
Railway stations in Australia opened in 1916
Main Southern railway line, New South Wales